Iisaku Parish was a rural municipality of Ida-Viru County in northern Estonia. It had a population of 1425 and an area of 258 km².

Settlements
Small borough
Iisaku
Villages
Alliku - Imatu - Jõuga - Kasevälja - Kauksi - Koldamäe - Kuru - Lipniku - Lõpe - Pootsiku - Sõrumäe - Sälliku - Taga-Roostoja - Tammetaguse - Tärivere - Vaikla - Varesmetsa

Former municipalities of Estonia